The 2019 DTM Hockenheim Final is a motor racing event for the Deutsche Tourenwagen Masters held between 5 and 6 October 2019. The event, part of the 33rd season of the DTM, was held at the Hockenheimring in Germany.

Background
The final round of the DTM for 2019 was a dead rubber as far as the drivers' and manufacturers' championships were concerned, having already been won by René Rast and Audi respectively. The teams' championship however was far from resolved, as 32 points separated Audi squads Team Rosberg and Abt Sportsline with a potential 96 on offer.

Three guest entries from the Super GT Series' GT500 class were accepted into the race ahead of the Japanese series' adoption of the Class One Touring Car regulations used by DTM for 2020. One entry from each of the series' three manufacturers – Honda, Lexus and Nissan – made the trip, and were accompanied by five drivers; former Formula One World Champion Jenson Button would contest both races for Honda, Nick Cassidy and Ryō Hirakawa would contest a race each for Lexus and the same approach was taken by Nissan for their entry, fielding Tsugio Matsuda and Ronnie Quintarelli.

Results

Race 1

Qualifying

Race

Race 2

Qualifying

 – Car #99 received a five-place grid penalty for continual track limits abuse.

Race

Championship standings

Drivers Championship

Teams Championship

Manufacturers Championship

 Note: Only the top five positions are included for three sets of standings.

Footnotes

References

External links
Official website

|- style="text-align:center"
|width="35%"|Previous race:
|width="30%"|Deutsche Tourenwagen Masters2019 season
|width="40%"|Next race:

Hockenheim DTM 2
DTM Hockenheim